Border Crossing may refer to:

 Border Crossing (novel), a 2001 novel by English author Pat Barker
 Border Crossing, an album by saxophonist Mike Osborne
 Border Crossing (adventure), for the role-playing game  Espionage!
 Border control, the measures used by a country to monitor or regulate its borders
 Border checkpoint, the actual place to cross a border

See also
Boardercross, a type of snowboard competition
Crossing the Border (disambiguation)
Crossing Border Festival, an annual festival of music and books in The Hague
Wall crossing, a capital fundraising technique